Anne Fatoumata M'Bairo (born 8 May 1993) is a French judoka.

She participated at the 2018 World Judo Championships, winning a medal.

References

External links
 
 

1993 births
Living people
French female judoka
Judoka at the 2019 European Games
European Games medalists in judo
European Games bronze medalists for France
Sportspeople from Toulon
21st-century French women